R Malsawmtluanga (born 12 September 1992) is an Indian professional footballer who plays as a midfielder for Aizawl in the I-League.

Career
Malsawmtluanga started his career for Chanmari in the Mizoram Premier League, earning player the year honours in 2014, and the Mizoram football team.

Malsawmtluanga made his professional debut for Aizawl in the I-League on 9 January 2016 against the reigning champions, Mohun Bagan. He played the full match as Aizawl lost 3–1.
best player in MPL 2017

Career statistics

Club

References

External links 
 ZoFooty Profile.

1990 births
Living people
Indian footballers
Aizawl FC players
Association football midfielders
Footballers from Mizoram
I-League 2nd Division players
I-League players